Pomegranate molasses, also known as Dibs Ar-rumman (rakkaz rimonim , robb-e anâr , melása rodioú , "pomegranate syrup"), and nar ekshisi ("pomegranate sour"), is a Middle Eastern seasoning consisting of concentrated pomegranate juice. It is usually used in fish and meat dishes, and also as a replacement for vinegar in salads.

About 
It contains 10% citric acid and 45% sugar. Dishes get a light sour taste because of narsharab.

Preparation 
Recipes for narsharab vary. Commonly, unpeeled pomegranates are squeezed and heated to evaporate the juice. It is cooked to half its original volume. After the juice is thickened, sugar, coriander, basil, cinnamon, sometimes black or red pepper are added.

See also 
 Nardenk
 Levantine cuisine
 Arabic cuisine
 Middle Eastern cuisine
 Israeli cuisine
 Iranian cuisine
 Azerbaijani cuisine
 Lavangi

References 

Azerbaijani cuisine
Iranian cuisine
Israeli cuisine
Levantine cuisine
Turkish cuisine